Glenn Wade Salisbury (1910 – 1994) was an American agriculture reproductive biologist who a was a leading figure in promoting the use of artificial insemination in dairy cows to maximize the use of superior paternal genes.

Honor
 National Academy of Sciences member (1974)
 Wolf Prize in Agriculture (1981)

References

1910 births
1994 deaths
American biologists
Cornell University alumni
20th-century biologists